Wierzbowa may refer to the following places in Poland:
Wierzbowa, Lower Silesian Voivodeship (south-west Poland)
Wierzbowa, Poddębice County in Łódź Voivodeship (central Poland)
Wierzbowa, Sieradz County in Łódź Voivodeship (central Poland)